Fedikovella beanii is a species of sea snail, deep-sea limpet, a marine gastropod mollusk in the family Cocculinidae.

Distribution

Description 
The maximum recorded shell length is 7.2 mm.

Habitat 
Minimum recorded depth is 210 m. Maximum recorded depth is 1483 m.

References

Further reading 
 Ardila N. E. & Harasewych M. G. (June 2005). "Cocculinid and pseudococculinid limpets (Gastropoda: Cocculiniformia) from off the Caribbean coast of Colombia". Proceedings of the Biological Society of Washington 118(2): 344–366. .

External links

Cocculinidae
Gastropods described in 1882